The women's 5000 metres event at the 2016 Summer Olympics took place between 16–19 August at the Olympic Stadium in Rio de Janeiro.

Summary
Almaz Ayana came into this race with the number two time in history, run just two and a half months earlier.  That race in Rome came within a second and a half of the world record, so expectations were high.  Ayana's strategy was well known to these competitors, she had used it to win the World Championships in 2015, the qualification to these Olympics and to win the 10,000 metres at these Olympics.  In particular, Vivian Cheruiyot had experienced it first hand in that 10,000, being relegated to silver.

The final started with confusion as the athletes were called to the line three times before the gun was actually fired.  Once started Miyuki Uehara went to the front, her move immediately covered by Ayana.  The two opened up a 7-metre gap in the first 200 metres of the race.  The next lap in 74 seconds was slow and the field, led by four Kenyans reeled in the leaders.  Uehara led for 4 and a quarter relatively slow laps, then Ayana executed her strategy, she accelerated.  The Kenyans; Cheruiyot, Hellen Onsando Obiri, Mercy Cherono and Yasemin Can running for Turkey rushed to try to cover the move.  After 75 second laps, Ayana dropped it to 65 seconds, establishing a 25-metre lead on the pack of Kenyans led by Can and Cheruiyot.  Ten other runners in the race were dropped to 60 metres back, with only Senbere Teferi in a no man's land in between groups.  Ayana's next two laps were 66 and 68.  Can fell off, but the three Kenyans stayed with the pace.  The next lap was 69 seconds, but more importantly, unlike her previous races, the gap was not growing.  With 1000 metres remaining in the race, Cherono fell off the back but Cheruiyot accelerated with Obiri trying to hold on.  The gap was shrinking.  Within 300 metres, it disappeared as Cheruiyot went past Ayana.  In the next hundred metres, Obiri also went by Ayana.  With a lap to go, Cheruiyot had run the 66 second lap and Cheruiyot the 25 metre gap, Ayana was struggling to hold onto any medal at all.  Running a 65.59 last lap, Cheruiyot extended the gap to 50 metres, and almost 20 back to Obiri to take gold and leave Obiri silver.  Ayana held on to third for the bronze medal.  All three were under the previous Olympic record.

The medals were presented by Dagmawit Girmay Berhane, IOC member, Ethiopia and Dahlan Jumaan al-Hamad, Vice President of the IAAF.

Competition format
The women's 5000m competition consisted of heats (Round 1) and a final. The fastest competitors from each race in the heats qualified for the final along with the fastest overall competitors not already qualified that were required to fill the (normally) sixteen spaces in the final. Due to falls in heat 2, eighteen runners contested the final.

Records
, the existing World and Olympic records were as follows.

The following record was established during the competition:

Schedule
All times are Brasilia Time (UTC-3)

Results

Heats

Heat 1

Heat 2 

In heat 2, Bibiro Ali Taher did not finish due to a mistake because he heard the bell for the people who were a lap of her and she thought it was her final lap and pulled out with 400m to go. Also during the race, Abbey D'Agostino and Nikki Hamblin collided and fell. D'Agostino was the first to get up but instead of running ahead, she stopped to help Hamblin. Later in the race, it turned out that D'Agostino's injury was the more serious as she started limping and fell again. This time, Hamblin stopped and encouraged her to get up and finish the race. After the race, organizers decided to reinstate them both as finalists, along with Jennifer Wenth who was also impeded by the collision.  Hamblin and D’Agostino were later awarded a Fair Play Award by the International Fair Play Committee for their actions in the heat.  Injured, D'Agostino did not start the final.

Final

Notes

References

Women's 5000 metres
2016
2016 in women's athletics
Women's events at the 2016 Summer Olympics